Hugh Dillon (born May 31, 1963) is a Canadian singer and actor who is the lead vocalist of rock band Headstones. He is also a film and television actor; his notable roles include Mike Sweeney in Durham County, Ed Lane in Flashpoint and Sheriff Donnie Haskell in Yellowstone. He is also the co-creator, executive producer and series regular of the Paramount+ series Mayor of Kingstown.

Early life 
Dillon was born and grew up in Kingston, Ontario. Dillon grew up living on the same street as future NHL star Doug Gilmour and would play hockey with him on the frozen swamp in their neighbourhood. Dillon also played hockey with Paul Langlois, future guitarist of The Tragically Hip. Dillon attended the Kingston Collegiate and Vocational Institute at the same time that David Usher and members of The Tragically Hip such as Gord Downie attended the school. After high school, Dillon briefly attended Queen's University and lived in London, England, before moving to Toronto and now divides his time between there and Los Angeles.

Music career 

Dillon is the lead singer for rock band Headstones. Formed in 1987, the band's debut album Picture of Health was released in 1993 and featured the singles "When Something Stands For Nothing", "Cemetery", "Tweeter and the Monkey Man" and "Three Angels". The album was met with critical acclaim and commercial success, being certified platinum in Canada for selling in excess of 100,000 copies. In a recording career that has spanned three decades, the band has released ten studio albums and numerous chart-topping singles.

After the Headstones broke up in 2003, Dillon formed the band Hugh Dillon Redemption Choir, an indie rock band whose style draws from country, pop, punk and new wave influences. Band members were guitarist J.P. Polsoni, Chris Osti on bass, keyboardist Ben Kobayashi, and percussionist Derek Downham. The band released an album, The High Co$t of Low Living, in 2005 through The Tragically Hip guitarist Paul Langlois's Ching Music label.  Dillon also released a solo album entitled Works Well with Others in 2009 through Ching Music.

After their hiatus, original Headstones members (Dillon, Carr & White) reformed the band in 2011. In 2013, they crowdfunded their album, Love + Fury, through PledgeMusic. Love + Fury is the band's first top 10 album, and it garnered the band a No. 1 hit single. The Headstones followed up with another crowdfunded album in 2014, One in the Chamber Music. In 2015, Fuck It became the band's first-ever vinyl release.

Little Army was released on Cadence Music in 2017. The album included the No. 1 hit "Devil's On Fire". In 2019, the Headstones released Peopleskills, which yielded "Leave It All Behind" and "Horses", two No. 3 singles on the US Billboard charts.

Acting career 
Dillon's first large-screen acting role was in director Bruce McDonald's 1995 film Dance Me Outside. He then played a leading role as Joe Dick in McDonald's 1996 feature film, Hard Core Logo.

Dillon has appeared in a number of feature films, including Lone Hero, 2005's Assault on Precinct 13, and Ginger Snaps Back: The Beginning. In 2007, he was nominated for a 2007 Genie Award for Best Supporting Actor for his role in Trailer Park Boys: The Movie. He starred opposite Vera Farmiga in the Sundance Film Festival award-winning movie, Down to the Bone. Dillon has guest-starred on various television programs, including The Eleventh Hour, ReGenesis, and Degrassi: The Next Generation. He has also created voice-overs a number of television and radio advertisements.

Dillon starred as Mike Sweeney in the Canadian dramatic series Durham County. His performance earned him a Gemini nomination for Best Actor in 2008; the show itself won five Gemini awards and its second season was aired on TMN and Movie Central.

Dillon starred as Sergeant Ed Lane in the CTV/CBS police drama series Flashpoint, set in Toronto, which ran for five seasons between 2008 and 2012. Dillon won the "Shaw Media Award for Best Performance by an Actor in a Continuing Leading Dramatic Role" at the Canadian Screen Awards in 2014 for his performance in the episode "Fit for Duty" on Flashpoint.

Dillon is the Co-creator and Executive Producer of the streaming service series Mayor of Kingstown on Paramount Plus. On August 5 via Deadline it was announced that Dillon would also become a series regular playing the role of Ian Ferguson, alongside Jeremy Renner, and he will return as Sheriff Donnie Haskell on season 4 of the cable series Yellowstone on Paramount, alongside Kevin Costner. He also played the role of Francis Becker on the third season of the American crime drama series, The Killing opposite Joel Kinnaman, simultaneously appearing on Continuum. Dillon played a lead role for three seasons of CBC's X Company. Dillon has also appeared in Twin Peaks, feature film Wind River alongside Elizabeth Olsen and Jeremy Renner, Syfy's The Expanse, and feature films The Humanity Bureau and I Still See You.

Filmography

Film

Television

Video games

Discography

Headstones 
Picture of Health (1993)
Teeth and Tissue (1995)
Smile and Wave (1997)
Nickels for Your Nightmares (2000)
The Greatest Fits (2001)
The Oracle of Hi-Fi (2002)
Love + Fury (2013)
One in the Chamber Music (2014)
Little Army (2017)
PeopleSkills (2019)
Flight Risk (2022)

Hugh Dillon Redemption Choir 
The High Co$t of Low Living (2005)

Solo 
Works Well with Others (the first solo album, released October 13, 2009, many of its songs are featured on the television show Flashpoint, track listing:

References

External links 

1963 births
Living people
Canadian male film actors
Canadian rock singers
Canadian male television actors
Canadian male video game actors
Canadian male voice actors
Male actors from Kingston, Ontario
Musicians from Kingston, Ontario
20th-century Canadian male actors
20th-century Canadian male singers
21st-century Canadian male actors
Best Actor in a Drama Series Canadian Screen Award winners
21st-century Canadian male singers
Best Supporting Actor in a Television Film or Miniseries Canadian Screen Award winners